Joko Suprianto (born 21 January 1966) is an Indonesian former badminton player who was one of the world's leading men's singles players in the early and mid-1990s, a period during which Indonesia was especially deep in top tier singles players, winning many of the world's major events.

Career 
Suprianto became world champion in men's singles in the 1993 IBF World Championships, defeating fellow countryman Hermawan Susanto in the final, and was a member of world champion Indonesian Thomas Cup (men's international) teams in 1994, 1996, and 1998.

He played badminton at the 1996 Summer Olympics in men's singles. He was the #1-seed but was defeated in the quarterfinals by Malaysia's Rashid Sidek 15–5, 15–12. In September 1996, Suprianto once again took top spot in the men's singles world ranking over Chinese top player Dong Jiong.

Personal life 
Suprianto married former Indonesian women's double badminton player, Zelin Resiana in 1999, and the two have twins on 24 March 2003, Bilqis Prasista and Bilqis Pratista, both join Djarum Badminton Club. Bilqis Prasista joined Indonesia national badminton team in 2020.

Achievements

World Championships 
Men's singles

World Cup 
Men's singles

Asian Games 
Men's singles

Asian Championships 
Men's singles

Asian Cup 
Men's singles

Southeast Asian Games 
Men's singles

IBF World Grand Prix 
The World Badminton Grand Prix sanctioned by International Badminton Federation (IBF) from 1983 to 2006.

Men's singles

 IBF Grand Prix tournament
 IBF Grand Prix Finals tournament

Invitational tournament 
Men's doubles

References

External links 
 BWF Player Profile
 Smash - Joko Supriyanto

1966 births
Living people
People from Surakarta
Sportspeople from Central Java
Indonesian male badminton players
Badminton players at the 1996 Summer Olympics
Olympic badminton players of Indonesia
Badminton players at the 1990 Asian Games
Badminton players at the 1994 Asian Games
Asian Games gold medalists for Indonesia
Asian Games silver medalists for Indonesia
Asian Games bronze medalists for Indonesia
Asian Games medalists in badminton
Medalists at the 1990 Asian Games
Medalists at the 1994 Asian Games
Competitors at the 1991 Southeast Asian Games
Competitors at the 1993 Southeast Asian Games
Competitors at the 1995 Southeast Asian Games
Competitors at the 1997 Southeast Asian Games
Southeast Asian Games gold medalists for Indonesia
Southeast Asian Games silver medalists for Indonesia
Southeast Asian Games bronze medalists for Indonesia
Southeast Asian Games medalists in badminton
World No. 1 badminton players
21st-century Indonesian people
20th-century Indonesian people